This article contains all of the individual records of players in the FIBA EuroChallenge competition. The FIBA EuroChallenge was the 3rd-tier level European-wide professional basketball league. The league is now defunct.

Points

Rebounds

Assists

Steals

Blocks

References

Individual records
Basketball statistics